Hyde and Go Tweet is a 1960 Warner Bros. Merrie Melodies animated short directed by Friz Freleng. The voices were performed by Mel Blanc. The short was released on May 14, 1960, and stars Tweety and Sylvester.

The short is the third directed by Freleng based on Robert Louis Stevenson's 1886 novella Strange Case of Dr. Jekyll and Mr. Hyde. The title is a play on the game hide and go seek. It was featured in the film Daffy Duck's Quackbusters, with new animation showing Sylvester in Daffy's office.

Plot
Sylvester is sleeping on the ledge of a tall building. He is just outside the window of the laboratory and office of mild-mannered Dr. Jekyll, who is shown entering the laboratory, drinking a Hyde Formula and briefly turning into a monstrous, evilly laughing alter-ego. Sylvester hears the laughter and awakens, startled, but when he looks inside the window, he sees only the re-transformed Jekyll departing the laboratory. Sylvester laughs it off and goes back to sleep.

Suddenly waking up, Sylvester tries to catch some pigeons, but to no avail. He then pursues his prey, Tweety, along the building's ledge. Tweety escapes into the laboratory and jumps into the Hyde Formula bottle. Sylvester demands that Tweety show himself, which he does, thanks to the Hyde formula, now as a crazy, evilly laughing giant bird-monster that begins chasing Sylvester.

For most of the rest of the cartoon, Tweety frequently switches between his usual, innocent self (which Sylvester chases) and the evil bird-monster (from which Sylvester runs away). After several back-and-forth chases (which includes Sylvester being tricked by the normal Tweety into running into an out of order chute for an elevator, as well as jumping out a window to escape the evil bird-monster form), Sylvester nabs a normal-sized Tweety. The cat, unaware of his potential meal and the monster are one and the same, locks himself in a small kitchen, throws the key out the window to make sure that Tweety "don't get out and that 'goon' don't get in," and begins to make Tweety into a sandwich. But while Sylvester is searching for some ketchup, Tweety changes back into his menacing, Hyde-like self and devours his adversary whole in a single gulp ("What? No ketchup? Well, I guess I'll just have to eat you without keeeETCH...!"). Finally realizing that the monstrous bird is Tweety, Sylvester frees himself and desperately tries to escape from the room.

Just then, Sylvester awakens...to realize that this whole experience was only a nightmare and to see a normal-sized Tweety struggling to fly to the ledge of the building. Fearing the events of his nightmare are about to come true, Sylvester cries out and runs through a brick wall to escape ("Help! Save me! Ah, ah, ah! Save me! He's a killer! HELP!!!"). Two cats (variants of two of the cats in Birds Anonymous) observe his action and each remark "Most outrageous exhibition of wanton cowardice." and "Tsk, tsk, tsk, tsk, tsk...Shameful." Tweety agrees on that, closing the cartoon by telling the audience, "Yeah, shameful!"

See also
 List of American films of 1960

References

External links

 

1960s English-language films
1960 animated films
1960 short films
1960 horror films
1960s science fiction horror films
Merrie Melodies short films
Short films directed by Friz Freleng
Dr. Jekyll and Mr. Hyde films
Films scored by Milt Franklyn
Animated films about cats
Animated films about birds
American science fiction horror films
1960s Warner Bros. animated short films
Films with screenplays by Michael Maltese
Tweety films
Sylvester the Cat films